Raja Narasimha is a 2003 Indian Kannada-language romantic action film directed by Muthyala Subbaiah and written by Posani Krishna Murali. The film stars Vishnuvardhan along with Ramya Krishna and Raasi in the prominent roles. The film was produced by Medikonda Amaravathi under the Sri Venkataramana Productions banner.

The film released on 21 March 2003 to generally positive reviews from critics. However, the film failed commercially at the box office.

The same story was later used in the Telugu movie Palnati Brahmanayudu which released six weeks after the release of this movie. However, that movie added few sequences which were not there in this movie like the train moving in reverse gear.

Cast
 Vishnuvardhan as  Raja Narasimha
 Ramya Krishna as Soundarya
 Raasi as Mahalakshmi
 Annapoorna
 Avinash
 Pavithra Lokesh
 Shivaram
 Abhijeeth
 Chi Guru Dutt
 Shobharaj
 Renuka Prasad

Soundtrack
The music of the film was composed by Deva to the lyrics of K. Kalyan. The song "Priya Priya" was inspired by the very famous Pakistani Junoon band song "Sayonee".

References

External source

 songs list

2003 films
2000s Kannada-language films
Indian action films
Films scored by Deva (composer)
Films directed by Muthyala Subbaiah
2003 action films